To have a chip on one's shoulder refers to the act of having an ego or being arrogant that readily provokes disputation.

History

This idiom traces its roots back to a custom that was known in North America since the early 19th century. The New York newspaper Long Island Telegraph reported on 20 May 1830 "when two churlish boys were determined to fight, a chip [of wood] would be placed on the shoulder of one, and the other demanded to knock it off at his peril". A similar notion is mentioned in the issue of the Onondaga Standard of Syracuse, New York on 8 December 1830: "'He waylay me', said I, 'the mean sneaking fellow—I am only afraid that he will sue me for damages. Oh! if I only could get him to knock a chip off my shoulder, and so get round the law, I would give him one of the soundest thrashings he ever had'."

Some time later in 1855, the phrase "chip on his shoulder" appeared in the Weekly Oregonian, stating "Leland, in his last issue, struts out with a chip on his shoulder, and dares Bush to knock it off". In American author Mark Twain's 1898 manuscript of Schoolhouse Hill, character Tom Sawyer states his knowledge of the phrase and custom when he says, "[I]f you want your fuss, and can't wait till recess, which is regular, go at it right and fair; put a chip on your shoulder and dare him to knock it off."

In Canada, the custom is well described at St. Peter Claver's Indian Residential School for Ojibway boys in the town of Spanish, Ontario:

The challenger might further provoke his opponent by issuing a dare for him to knock off the chip. The opponent might then display his bravery and contempt by brushing the cheek of the challenger lightly as he did so. In more formal cases, a second might take the chip and present the chip to his man who would then place it on his own shoulder. The boys would then square off and fistfight like boxers.

In popular culture

Literal occurrences 

 Morley Callaghan's 1948 novella Luke Baldwin's Vow details a tense exchange between Luke and his frenemy Elmer, in which a chip is moved from the shoulder of one boy to the other before being struck off.

 In the 1968 movie The Shakiest Gun in the West, after running into Arnold the Kid, Dr. Jesse Heywood places a chip on his own shoulder and says, "Ippity-doo, kanaba dip, double dare, knock off the chip".

 In a 1970s commercial for a household battery, Robert Conrad dared the viewer to knock an Eveready battery off his shoulder.

Figurative occurrences 

 In 1964, The Beatles released a song, "I'll Cry Instead", containing the line "I've got a chip on my shoulder that's bigger than my feet".

 In 1969, The Kinks song "Australia" says "Nobody's got a chip on their shoulder".

 In 1979, AC/DC released "Shot Down in Flames", a song containing the line "When a guy with a chip on his shoulder said: Toss off buddy she's mine".

 Soft Cell's 1981 album Non-Stop Erotic Cabaret includes the track "Chips On My Shoulder", the lyrics of which feature the narrator lamenting his own entitlement and hypocrisy – "Misery, complaints, self-pity, injustice / Chips on my shoulder".

 In 2003, 50 Cent released a song, ""Many Men (Wish Death)", using this phrase.

 In 2006, Beyonce released a song, "Upgrade U", with the line "This ain't no shoulder with a chip, or an ego".

 The 2007 musical Legally Blonde has a song titled "Chip on My Shoulder". In this, after being accused of having a chip on his shoulder, Emmett Forrest explains to Elle Woods that the need to prove himself motivates him.

 In 2017, Taylor Swift, Ed Sheeran, and Future released a song, "End Game", with the line "I got issues and chips on both of my shoulders".

 In 2017, Kendrick Lamar released a song, "FEEL.", off his album DAMN., using this phrase.

 In 2018, Calpurnia released a single, Louie, using the phrase.

 In 2020, Justin Bieber and Shawn Mendes released a song, "Monster", with the line "I had a chip on my shoulder, had to let it go".

 The Hives in the song "Howlin’ Pelle Talks to the Kids" talk-sings "I got a chip on my shoulder, the size of a boulder, and I might get it off".

 Warren G's song "What's Next" (featuring Mr. Malik) uses this phrase.

References

Traditions
English-language idioms
Combat
Metaphors referring to body parts
Metaphors referring to objects
Metaphors referring to war and violence